Włodzimierz Halka Ledóchowski, S.J. (fr: Vladimir, de: Vlodimir; 7 October 1866 – 13 December 1942) was a Polish Catholic priest who served as the 26th Superior-General of the Society of Jesus from 11 February 1914 until his death in 1942. Prior to taking holy orders, he was briefly a page in the Habsburg Court.

Early life
He was one of nine children of Count Antoni Halka Ledóchowski and the Swiss Countess Joséphine née Salis-Zizers. He was born in a manor house built by his father in Loosdorf, near St. Pölten, Lower Austria. His uncle was Cardinal Mieczysław Halka-Ledóchowski, and two of his sisters entered the religious life and have become known as Saint Urszula Ledóchowska and Blessed Teresa Ledóchowska. His brother, Ignacy Kazimierz Ledóchowski, was a General in the Polish Army.

Ledóchowski studied first at the Theresianum in Vienna and was for a time page to the Empress Elizabeth. He went on to study Law at the Jagellonian University in Kraków. He discerned a religious vocation and turned to studies for the priesthood. While attending the Gregorian University in Rome, he applied to join the Jesuits and entered the Society in 1889. Five years later he was ordained priest. At first he took to writing, but was soon made Superior of the Jesuit house in Kraków, then Rector of the College. He became the Polish Vice-Provincial in 1901 and Provincial of Southern Poland in 1902. From 1906 until February 1915 he was an assistant in the German province.

Superior-General of the Jesuits
After the death of Franz Xavier Wernz in August 1914, 49-year-old Ledóchowski became a candidate for the leadership of his order. He was elected the 26th General of the Society on 11 February 1915 on the second ballot.

Despite the serial upheavals of the First World War, the Second World War, and the economic Depression of the 1930s, the Society increased in number during Ledóchowski's term of office. He called the 27th General Congregation to take place at the Germanico to acquaint the Society with the new code of Canon law (published in 1917) and to bring the Jesuit Constitution into line with it. He called another Congregation (the 28th) – between 12 March and 9 May 1937 – for the purpose of appointing appoint a vicar general as with the effects of age he sought competent assistance.

He established the Pontifical Oriental Institute and the Pontifical Russian College and the Institutum Biblicum of the Gregorian University. He extracted a certain emancipation for the Society after the Concordat between the Church and the Italian Government was ratified. Property was returned to the Society, making it possible for the Jesuits to build a new Gregorian University building, transferring from the Palazzo Gabrielli-Borromeo on via del Seminario to Piazza Pilotta near the Quirinal Palace. He then had built the new Curia Generalis in the rione of Borgo, on property acquired from the Holy See on Borgo Santo Spirito, close to Saint Peter's Square. The Concordat is credited with giving new life to the Society of Jesus, whose real-estate increased along with its influence and reputation.

Nazi era

Divided opinions
According to David Kertzer's 2014 book, The Pope and Mussolini: The Secret History of Pius XI and the Rise of Fascism in Europe, during the rise of Fascism in Italy under Mussolini, Ledóchowski had exhibited strong anti-Semitic and pro-Fascist sympathies. Kertzer writes that Ledóchowski worked to promote anti-Semitism in the Vatican and to align the Vatican with Italy's and Germany's racist and expansionist ambitions. "The Jesuit leader [Ledochowski] made no secret of his enthusiasm for the Fascist regime. From the time when Mussolini came to power, he [Ledochowski] had done what he could to stamp out Church opposition to the Duce". Kertzer further states that: "...[I]n early 1936, the Italian ambassador told Ledochowski that Mussolini wanted America [the US Jesuit magazine] anti-Fascist editor fired and a pro-Fascist editor put in his place...Ledochowski accommodated him readily... Soon a new editor was in place, suitably enthusiastic about the Fascist cause". Furthermore, "Pignatti [the Italian ambassador] remarked that Italy's enemies were the Church's enemies. Ledochowski agreed. The attacks on Mussolini for waging war in Ethiopia, he [Ledochowski] replied were simply a 'pretext from which international Judaism is profiting in order to advance its attack on western civilization'".

Kertzer writes that there is evidence that in 1937/8 Ledóchowski personally intervened to water down an encyclical against racism that was being prepared for the Pope by a fellow Jesuit, the American John LaFarge Jr. Later discoveries of versions  of the text for the planned encyclical and a series of interviews with living participants in the drafting of the document in the 1960s & 70s seems to confirm Ledóchowski's reluctance to see anything too critical of the then German/Nazi government published.

Kertzer says: "Ledochowski viewed the Jews as enemies of the Church and of European civilization, and he would do all he could to prevent the Pope from slowing the anti-Semitic wave that was sweeping Europe". Kertzer documents many other instances in which Ledóchowski, and the Jesuit order which he headed, led and manipulated the Vatican and the Church into supporting Mussolini and the infamous racist laws against the Jews.

Support for Allied resistance
According to Jesuit historian Vincent A. Lapomarda, there was "no doubt" about Ledóchowski's concern to thwart Nazi Germany in Europe once they had invaded Poland, 

"Even if he had at one time entertained, as alleged by one historian, the conception of a union of a Catholic bloc in Europe against the Communists in the East and the Protestants in the West, events had dramatically altered that vision."

Ledóchowski accurately surmised Hitler's perfidious nature, and predicted the Hitler-Stalin Pact, and used the Jesuit-run Vatican Radio service to broadcast condemnations of Nazi crimes in Poland, which led to German government protests, and assisted underground resistance movements in occupied Europe. The Nazi persecution of the Catholic Church in Poland was particularly severe, and Lapomarda writes that Ledóchowski helped "stiffen the general attitude of the Jesuits against the Nazis", and helped Vatican Radio, run by the Jesuit Filippo Soccorsi, and spoke out against Nazi oppression - particularly with regard to Poland - and against Vichy-French anti-Semitism.

Death
Włodzimierz Ledóchowski died in Rome on 13 December 1942, aged 76. After his funeral in the Church of the Gesù, his remains were interred in the Society's mausoleum at Campo Verano, on the eastern edge of Rome.

Appraisal
Nicholas Murray Butler, who met Ledóchowski in 1930, later wrote lthat "in Rome I was told that Father Ledóchowski would rank as one of the two or three greatest heads of the Jesuit Order".

See also
 Ledóchowski, a Ledóchowski family overview
 Ursula Ledóchowska, the canonized sister of Włodzimierz Ledóchowski
 Maria Teresia Ledóchowska, the beatified sister of Wúodzimierz Ledóchowski
 Michel d'Herbigny

References
 

 

1866 births
1942 deaths
People from Melk District
Superiors General of the Society of Jesus
20th-century Austrian Jesuits
Austrian people of Polish descent
19th-century Austrian Jesuits
Pontifical Oriental Institute
Włodzimierz